Wales is a country that is part of the United Kingdom and the island of Great Britain. Over the last 250 years, Wales has been transformed first from a predominantly agricultural country to an industrial, and now a post-industrial economy. Since the Second World War, the service sector has come to account for the majority of jobs, a feature typifying most advanced economies. From the middle of the 19th century until the post-war era, the mining and export of coal was a dominant industry. At its peak of production in 1913, nearly 233,000 men and women were employed in the south Wales coalfield, mining 56 million tons of coal. From the mid-1970s, the Welsh economy faced massive restructuring with large numbers of jobs in traditional heavy industry disappearing and being replaced eventually by new ones in light industry and in services. In the late 1970s and early 1980s, Wales was successful in attracting an above average share of foreign direct investment in the UK. However, much of the new industry was essentially of a "branch factory" ("screwdriver factory") type where a manufacturing plant or call centre is located in Wales but the most highly paid jobs in the company are retained elsewhere.

Notable firms 
This list includes notable companies with primary headquarters located in the country. The industry and sector follow the Industry Classification Benchmark taxonomy. Organizations which have ceased operations are included and noted as defunct.

See also 
 Economy of Wales
 List of restaurants in Wales
 Media in Wales
 Transport in Wales

References 

Companies

Wales

Companies